In number theory, a Descartes number is an odd number which would have been an odd perfect number, if one of its composite factors were prime. They are named after René Descartes who observed that the number   would be an odd perfect number if only  were a prime number, since the sum-of-divisors function for  would satisfy, if 22021 were prime,

where we ignore the fact that 22021 is composite.

The example given is the only one currently known.

If  were prime,  would be an odd perfect number.

Properties

Generalizations

John Voight generalized Descartes numbers to allow negative bases. He found the example .  Subsequent work by a group at Brigham Young University found more examples similar to Voight's example,  and also allowed a new class of spoofs where one is allowed to also not notice that a prime is the same as another prime in the factorization.

See also
Erdős–Nicolas number, another type of almost-perfect number

Notes

References
 
 

Divisor function
Integer sequences